Strata is the self-titled debut album by the Californian music group Strata. The album was released on July 27, 2004 via Wind-Up Records. The songs "Never There (She Stabs)" and "The Panic" were released as singles, both having music videos. The song "Piece by Piece" was featured on the soundtrack to the 2004 movie The Punisher and the video game Madden NFL 2005.  The album is largely a re-recorded version of their second independent album, When It's All Burning.

Track listing

When It's All Burning Track listing

Personnel

Strata
Eric Victorino – Lead vocals, guitar on "Trust Kill Trust"
Ryan Hernandez – Guitar, backing vocals, keyboards, piano, cello on "Today", additional vocals on "Just Like Silk" bass and programming on "Trust Kill Trust"
Hrag Chanchanian – Bass guitar, backing whisper vocals on "Just Like Silk"
Adrian Robison – Drums, percussion, breathing vocals on "Just Like Silk"

Additional musicians
Gavin Hayes – Slide guitar on "When Its All Burning"

Management
John Boyle – Management for Sanctuary Artist Management
Doug LeDuc & Davud Weise –  Business Management for Gleiberman, Weise, & Associates
Jeffrey Light – Legal for Myman, Abell, Fineman, Greenspan, & Light, Los Angeles, CA
Diana Meltzer –  A&R
Gregg Wattenberg – A&R/Wind-Up Records Production Supervisor
Chipper – A&R Administration
Philippa Murphy – A&R Coordination

Artwork
Ed Sherman, Strata – Art Direction
Aaron Marsh, Strata – Cover concept
Tucker "Lumberg" Harrison – Cover star
Sara Collins – Band photography
Creatas/Dynamic Graphics – Crow photo
Frank Veronsky – Additional photography

Production
Produced & engineered by Strata
Dan Certa – Additional production on tracks: 2,3, & 7, additional engineering on tracks: 2,7 & 10, mixing on track: 10
Stevo Bruno – Additional production on tracks: 5 & 11. Additional engineering on tracks: 5,11, & 12 
Jay Baumgardner – Mixing, additional production track 6
Mark Kiczula & Sergio Chavez –  Assistant engineers
Lior Goldenberg – Additional mixing engineering
Don Budd – Additional engineering on tracks: 1,2,3,4,5,6,8,10 & 11
Ted Jensen – Mastering
Gregg Wattenberg – Additional engineering on track 8

References

2004 debut albums
Strata (band) albums
Wind-up Records albums